Wuchang Chunghua University is the first private university in China that is independently founded by individuals without the help from government or foreigners. It was founded in 1912 by Chen Shi() and his father Chen Xuankai, and migrated to Chongqing during the Second Sino-Japanese War. After the Chinese Communist Revolution, Chunghua University was combinationed with Huachung University and Chung Yuan University to form today's Central China Normal University in 1952. Its old campus was left to Wuchang Wenhua Middle School.

Notable alumni
 Yun Daiying - early leader of the Chinese Communist Party.
 Guang Weiran - a Chinese poet and military leader.
 Chen Tanqiu - founding member of the Chinese Communist Party.

Reference

Universities and colleges in Wuhan
Defunct universities and colleges in China